The 2020 Afghan Premier League was ninth season of Afghan Premier League, the Afghan league for association football clubs, since its establishment in 2012. The season commenced on 24 September 2020. Shaheen Asmayee won their fifth title defeating Simorgh Alborz in the final, 1–0.

Teams
The following eight teams, which represent the country's eight main regions, participate in the 2020 Afghan Premier League.

De Abasin Sape
De Maiwand Atalan
De Spin Ghar Bazan
Mawjhai Amu
Oqaban Hindukush
Shaheen Asmayee
Simorgh Alborz
Toofaan Harirod

Group stage
The draw for the group stage was held on 18 September 2020.

Group A

Group B

Knockout stage

Semi-finals

Final

References

External links

Afghan Premier League seasons
Afghanistan
2020 in Afghan football